Crowle (rhymes with coal) is a village in Worcestershire, England situated  east of the City of Worcester.

Crowle is known for its Church of England St John the Baptist Church.

The village has a first school named Crowle First School. The Preschool houses the village's war memorial, listing the names of the ninety-six men from Crowle who served during the First World War. Opposite sits an enclave of houses whose streets bear the names of those fallen.

The village pub is The Old Chequers Inn.

Notable people 

 John Crabtree DL, OBE, businessman and former lawyer, lives in the village

References

External links

Crowle Online

Villages in Worcestershire